The 2014–15 Hofstra Pride women's basketball team represents Hofstra University during the 2014–15 NCAA Division I women's basketball season. The Pride, led by ninth year head coach Krista Kilburn-Steveskey, play their home games at Hofstra Arena and were members of the Colonial Athletic Association. They finished the season 20–13, 11–7 in CAA play to finish in a tie for third place. They advanced to the championship game of the CAA women's tournament where they lost to James Madison. They were invited to the Women's National Invitation Tournament where they lost in the first round to Penn.

Roster

Schedule

|-
!colspan=9 style="background:#16007C; color:#FFAD00;"| Regular Season

|-
!colspan=9 style="background:#16007C; color:#FFAD00;"| 2015 CAA Tournament

|-
!colspan=9 style="background:#16007C; color:#FFAD00;"| WNIT

See also
2014–15 Hofstra Pride men's basketball team

References

Hofstra Pride women's basketball seasons
Hofstra
2015 Women's National Invitation Tournament participants